The system of industrial rights in Japan celebrated 100 years of its existence in 1985. In celebration of the one-hundredth anniversary of the Japanese system of industrial property rights, the Japan Patent Office selected ten great inventors whose contributions were particularly memorable and of historical significance in the industrial development of Japan.

Reliefs of these inventors were created and presented in the lobby of the Japan Patent Office to commemorate their achievements and introduce them to Japanese people.

The inventors
The ten inventors are:
Sakichi Toyoda Patent Number 1195, Wooden Weaving Machine Driven by Human Power
Kōkichi Mikimoto Patent Number 2670, Cultured pearl
Jōkichi Takamine Patent Number 4785, Adrenaline
Kikunae Ikeda Patent Number 14805, Sodium Glutamate
Umetaro Suzuki Patent Number 20785, Vitamin B1
Kyota Sugimoto Patent Number 27877, Japanese typewriter
Kotaro Honda Patent Number 32234, KS Steel
Hidetsugu Yagi Patent Number 69115, Yagi Antenna
Yasujiro Niwa Patent Number 84722, Phototelegraphic Method
Tokushichi Mishima Patent Number 96371, MKM steel

See also
List of inventors
List of Japanese inventions

References

Japanese inventors
1985 in Japan
Japanese patent law